In the life extension movement, longevity escape velocity (LEV) or actuarial escape velocity or biological escape velocity is a hypothetical situation in which one's remaining life expectancy (not life expectancy at birth) is extended longer than the time that is passing.  For example, in a given year in which longevity escape velocity would be maintained, technological advances would increase people's remaining life expectancy more than the year that just went by. The term is meant as an analogy to the concept of escape velocity in physics, which is the minimum speed required for an object to indefinitely move away from a gravitational body despite the gravitational force pulling the object towards the body.

For many years in the past, life expectancy at each age has increased slightly every year as treatment strategies and technologies have improved. At present, more than one year of research is required for each additional year of expected life. Longevity escape velocity occurs when this ratio reverses, so that life expectancy increases faster than one year per one year of research, as long as that rate of advance is sustainable.

Mouse lifespan research has been the most contributive to conclusive evidence on the matter, since mice require only a few years before research results can be concluded.

The term "longevity escape velocity" was coined by biogerontologist Aubrey de Grey in a 2004 paper, but the concept has been present in the life extension community since at least the 1970s, such as in Robert Anton Wilson's essay Next Stop, Immortality. The concept is also part of the fictional history leading to multi-century youthful lifespans in the science fiction series The Mars Trilogy by Kim Stanley Robinson. More recent proponents include David Gobel, co-founder of the Methuselah Foundation and futurist, and technologist Ray Kurzweil, who named one of his books, Fantastic Voyage: Live Long Enough to Live Forever, after the concept. The last two claim that by putting further pressure on science and medicine to focus research on increasing limits of aging, rather than continuing along at its current pace, more lives will be saved in the future, even if the benefit is not immediately apparent.

The next step in spreading the idea and the term itself was the writing of Aubrey de Grey and Michael Rae of the book Ending Aging, in 2007.

Kurzweil predicts that longevity escape velocity will be reached before humanity will realize it. According to him, as of 2018, it will be reached in 10-12 years.

See also 
 Life extension
 Pro-aging trance
 Rejuvenation
 Transhumanism
 Timeline of senescence research

References 

Ageing
Life extension
Gerontology
Transhumanism